Milan Panović (born 27 February 1998) is a Serbian football forward.

Club career

Red Star Belgrade
As one of the youth academy players, Panović signed his first professional contract with Red Star Belgrade in February 2014. He was a member of the team which won the Serbian cadet league for the 2013–14 season. Playing for the youth team, Panović was labeled as a Luka Jović's successor in the first team. At the beginning of 2017, Panović was loaned to Bežanija on dual registration until the end of 2016–17 Serbian First League season. Panović scored his first senior goal on his debut match for Bežanija against Proleter Novi Sad, played on 12 March 2017. In summer 2017, Panović moved to Radnički Beograd as a single player.

International career
Panović was called into the selection of players born 1998 under Football Association of Belgrade in 2012 for the international tournament "Belgrade Trophy". After he was a Serbia national under-16 football team member, Panović was called to U17 level by coach Dejan Govedarica in 2015. Later, same year, he had also been called into U18 selection squad, until he broke leg in November 2015.

Career statistics

References

External links
 

1998 births
Living people
Association football forwards
Serbian footballers
Red Star Belgrade footballers
FK Bežanija players
FK Radnički Beograd players
RFK Grafičar Beograd players
FK Sinđelić Beograd players
Serbian First League players